This is a list of public–private partnerships in Puerto Rico. Such partnerships exist in the transportation sector and are being developed in other sectors, including public utilities, education and social programs.

 style="margin: 0 auto"
! scope=col style="text-align: left" | Name in English
! scope=col style="text-align: left" | Name in Spanish
! scope=col style="text-align: left" | Status
! scope=col style="text-align: left" | Sector
|-
| Aerostar Airport Holdings
| Aerostar
| in development
| transportation
|-
| Aqueducts and Sewers Authority
| Autoridad de Acueductos y Alcantarillados
| in research
| public utilities
|-
| Electric Power Authority
| Autoridad de Energía Eléctrica
| in research
| public utilities
|-
| Luis Muñoz Marín International Airport
| Aeropuerto Internacional Luis Muñoz Marín
| awaiting approval
| transportation
|-
| Metro Highways
| Metropistas| established
| transportation
|-
| New Beginnings
| Nuevo Comienzo
| in research
| social programs
|-
| Puerto Rico Expressways
| Autopistas de Puerto Rico
| established
| transportation
|-
| Schools for the 21st Century
| Escuelas del Siglo 21
| in development
| education
|-

References

Public–private partnerships in Puerto Rico